William Murat is a former member of the Wisconsin State Assembly.

Biography
Murat was born on December 4, 1957 in Stevens Point, Wisconsin. He graduated from Stevens Point Area Senior High School, the University of Wisconsin–Stevens Point, the University of Wisconsin-Madison and Columbia University.

Career
Murat was first elected to the Assembly in 1994 as a Democrat and was a member until 1999. He was succeeded by Julie Lassa.

References

People from Stevens Point, Wisconsin
Democratic Party members of the Wisconsin State Assembly
University of Wisconsin–Stevens Point alumni
University of Wisconsin–Madison alumni
Columbia University alumni
1957 births
Living people